The Great Western Trail is a hiking trail in the western United States that extends from Canada to Mexico.

Great Western Trail may also refer to:

Great Western Trail (Illinois)
Great Western Trail (Iowa)
Great Western Trail (board game)
Great Western Cattle Trail